Paul J. DeMarco (born July 20, 1967) is an American lawyer and politician from the state of Alabama. He is a Republican member of the Alabama House of Representatives, representing the 46th district since 2005. He ran in the United States House of Representatives elections in Alabama, 2014 in the 6th in the Republican Party primary.

Political career
DeMarco served as a page in the Alabama House while a high school student. He graduated cum laude from Auburn University with a Bachelor of Arts degree in journalism 1990, and from the University of Alabama School of Law with a juris doctor in 1993, where he served as the editor-in-chief of the Alabama Law Review.

DeMarco was elected to the Alabama House in a 2005 special election. DeMarco led the field in the seven-way Republican primary, the real contest in this heavily Republican district. He advanced to a runoff election, where he was defeated by former Alabama Policy Institute president Gary Palmer.

Committee assignments
Judiciary (chair)
Constitutions, Campaigns and Elections
Jefferson County Legislation

Personal
DeMarco and his wife, Jacqueline, live in Homewood, Alabama.

References

External links
Attorney profile at Parsons, Lee & Juliano, P.C. 
Rep. Paul DeMarco at the Alabama State Legislature
 

1967 births
Living people
Auburn University alumni
University of Alabama School of Law alumni
Republican Party members of the Alabama House of Representatives
People from Homewood, Alabama
Alabama lawyers